Yeomanry is a designation used by a number of units or sub-units of the British Army Reserve, descended from volunteer cavalry regiments. Today, Yeomanry units serve in a variety of different military roles.

History

Origins
In the 1790s, following the French Revolution and the rise of Napoleon Bonaparte, the perceived threat of invasion of the Kingdom of Great Britain was high. To improve the country's defences, Volunteer regiments were raised in many counties from yeomen. While the word "yeoman" in normal use meant a small farmer who owned his land, Yeomanry officers were drawn from the nobility or the landed gentry, and many of the men were the officers' tenants or had other forms of obligation to the officers. At its formation, the force was referred to as the Yeomanry Cavalry. Members of the yeomanry were not obliged to serve overseas without their individual consent.

Early 19th century
During the first half of the nineteenth century, Yeomanry Regiments were used extensively in support of the civil authority to quell riots and civil disturbances, including the Peterloo Massacre; as police forces were created and took over this role, the Yeomanry concentrated on local defence. In 1827, it was decided for financial reasons to reduce the number of yeomanry regiments, disbanding those that had not been required to assist the civil power over the previous decade. A number of independent troops were also dissolved. Following these reductions, the yeomanry establishment was fixed at 22 corps (regiments) receiving allowances and a further 16 serving without pay.

During the 1830s, the number of yeomanry units fluctuated, reflecting the level of civil unrest in any particular region at any particular time. The Irish Yeomanry, which had played a major role in suppressing the rebellion of 1798, was completely disbanded in 1838.

Mid and late 19th century
For the next thirty years, the Yeomanry Force was retained as a second line of support for the regular cavalry within Britain. Recruiting difficulties led to serious consideration being given to the disbandment of the entire force in 1870, but instead measures were taken the following year to improve its effectiveness. These included requirements that individual yeomanry troopers attend a minimum number of drills per year in return for a "permanent duty" allowance, and that units be maintained at a specific strength. Yeomanry officers and permanent drill instructors were required to undergo training at a newly established School of Instruction and the Secretary of State for War took over responsibility for the force, from individual Lords Lieutenant of counties. While these reforms improved the professionalism of the Yeomanry Force, numbers remained low (only 10,617 in 1881).

In 1876, the role of the Yeomanry Force was fixed as that of light cavalry. During the previous decades, horse artillery troops had been raised to be attached to a number of yeomanry regiments and dismounted detachments appeared where horses were not available in sufficient numbers. These supernumerary units were now abolished.

Boer War

During the Second Boer War, companies of Imperial Yeomanry were formed to serve overseas from volunteers from the Yeomanry. In 1901, all yeomanry regiments were redesignated as "Imperial Yeomanry", and reorganised. In 1908, the Imperial Yeomanry was merged with the Volunteer Force to form the Territorial Force, of which it became the cavalry arm. The "Imperial" title was dropped at the same time.

World War I and later
On the eve of World War I in 1914, there were 55 Yeomanry regiments (with two more formed in August 1914), each of four squadrons instead of the three of the regular cavalry. Upon embodiment, these regiments were either brought together to form mounted brigades or allocated as divisional cavalry. For purposes of recruitment and administration, the Yeomanry were linked to specific counties or regions, identified in the regimental title. Some of the units still in existence in 1914 dated back to those created in the 1790s, while others had been created during a period of expansion following on the Boer War.

After the First World War, the Territorial Force was disbanded and later reformed and redesignated as the Territorial Army. Following the experience of the war, only the fourteen senior yeomanry regiments retained their horses, with the rest being re-designated as armoured car companies, artillery, engineers, or signals. Two regiments were disbanded. The converted units retained their yeomanry traditions, with some artillery regiments having individual batteries representing different yeomanry units.

World War II
On the eve of the Second World War in 1939, the Territorial Army was doubled in size, with duplicate units formed; this led to some regiments being de-amalgamated. The last mounted regiment of yeomanry was the Queen's Own Yorkshire Dragoons, who were converted to an armoured role in March 1942, and later converted into an infantry battalion of the King's Own Yorkshire Light Infantry—KOYLI. Volunteers from the Yeomanry served in the Long Range Desert Group from 1940 through to 1943, incorporated into "Y Patrol".

Post-war
There were reductions in the size of the TA in both 1957 and 1961, which led to the amalgamation of some pairs of yeomanry regiments. There was a major reduction in reserve forces in 1967 with the formation of the Territorial and Army Volunteer Reserve; all existing yeomanry regiments were reduced to squadron, company or battery sub-units. A number of further reorganisations have taken place since then.

Current Yeomanry regiments
In the current Army Reserve, several remnants of former Yeomanry regiments are still serving, usually as a sub-unit of a larger unit:

Royal Yeomanry
C&S (Westminster Dragoons) Squadron
A (Sherwood Rangers Yeomanry) Squadron
B (Staffordshire, Warwickshire and Worcestershire Yeomanry) Squadron
C (Kent and Sharpshooters Yeomanry) Squadron (Croydon)
D (Shropshire Yeomanry) Squadron
E (Leicestershire and Derbyshire Yeomanry) Squadron
The Royal Yeomanry Band (Inns of Court & City Yeomanry)

Royal Wessex Yeomanry
B (Royal Wiltshire Yeomanry) Squadron
A (Dorset Yeomanry) Squadron
C (Royal Gloucestershire Hussars) Squadron
D (Royal Devon Yeomanry) Squadron
Y (Royal Wiltshire Yeomanry) Squadron

Queen's Own Yeomanry
A (Yorkshire Yeomanry) Squadron
B (Duke of Lancaster's Own Yeomanry) Squadron
C (Cheshire Yeomanry) Squadron
C & S (Command and support) (Northumberland Hussars) Squadron

Scottish and North Irish Yeomanry
A (Ayrshire (Earl of Carrick's Own) Yeomanry) Squadron in Ayr
B (North Irish Horse) Squadron in Beflast and Coleraine
C (Fife and Forfar Yeomanry/Scottish Horse) Squadron in Cupar
E (Lothians and Border Yeomanry) Squadron in Edinburgh

Other remnants of yeomanry units

Royal Signals
32 (Scottish) Signal Regiment
40 (North Irish Horse) Signal Squadron
37 Signal Regiment
54 (Queen's Own Warwickshire and Worcestershire Yeomanry) Support Squadron
39 (Skinners) Signal Regiment
93 (North Somerset Yeomanry) Support Squadron
94 (Berkshire Yeomanry) Signal Squadron
71st (City of London) Yeomanry Signal Regiment
31 (Middlesex Yeomanry) Signal Squadron
36 (Essex Yeomanry) Signal Squadron
68 (Inns of Court & City Yeomanry) Signal Squadron
265 (Kent and County of London Yeomanry (Sharpshooters)) Support Squadron

Royal Artillery
104 Regiment Royal Artillery
C (Glamorgan Yeomanry) Troop
106 (Yeomanry) Regiment Royal Artillery
457 (Hampshire Carabiniers Yeomanry) Battery
295 (Hampshire Yeomanry) Battery

Army Air Corps
6 Regiment, Army Air Corps
677 (Suffolk and Norfolk Yeomanry) Squadron Army Air Corps

Royal Engineers
101 (City of London) Engineer Regiment
2 (Surrey Yeomanry) Field Troop
1 (Sussex Yeomanry) Field Troop
71 Engineer Regiment
Lovat Scouts

Royal Logistic Corps
157 (Welsh) Regiment RLC
224 (Pembroke Yeomanry) Squadron
398 (Flint & Denbighshire Yeomanry) Squadron

165 Port and Maritime Regiment RLC
710 (Royal Buckinghamshire Hussars) Operational Hygiene Squadron
142 (Queen's Own Oxfordshire Hussars) Vehicle Squadron

First Aid Nursing Yeomanry  (Princess Royal's Volunteer Corps)
In 1907 the First Aid Nursing Yeomanry was established as an all female volunteer organisation to provide a link between field hospitals and the front line, with their primary role being to rescue the wounded, rather than provide nursing care. Because the organisation as initially formed was mounted it adopted the yeomanry name. The First Aid Nursing Yeomanry is an independent charity that is not part of the Armed Forces, today it provides teams to aid civil  agencies.

See also

Imperial Yeomanry
Yeomanry order of precedence
List of Yeomanry Regiments 1908
List of British Army Yeomanry Regiments converted to Royal Artillery

Other uses of yeoman:
 Yeomen Warders of Her Majesty's Royal Palace and Fortress the Tower of London
 Yeomen of the Guard, the Queen's Body Guard

References

Yeomanry regiments of the British Army
Cavalry regiments of the British Army
Army Reserve (United Kingdom)
Yeomen